Hill Brow is a small village in the East Hampshire district of Hampshire, England. It is on the B2070 road, formerly the A3 London to Portsmouth road. It is in the civil parish of Liss.

References

Villages in Hampshire
East Hampshire District